"Little Bear" is a song by indie band Guillemots.  It was written by Guillemots frontman Fyfe Dangerfield and is the opening track of the band's debut album, Through the Windowpane (2006).

In a radio programme celebrating the 40th anniversary of BBC station Radio 1, Paul McCartney named "Little Bear" as one of his "all-time favourite songs". McCartney called the track "a very brave way to open an album", and praised its "beautiful orchestration".

References

2006 songs
Guillemots (band) songs